Andinobates dorisswansonae, the dotted poison frog, is a species of amphibian in the family Dendrobatidae, endemic to Colombia in the outskirts of Falan and north of the department of Tolima. It is toxic to humans.

Description 
Its skin is bright black or dark brown with red, orange or yellow spots.  It is distinguished in addition to other similar dendrobathids because it has the first and second toes fused, a characteristic that it shares only with a nearby species, Andinobates daleswansoni. Males measure between 16.2 and 17.1 mm in length and females between 17.5 and 19.4 mm.

Behavior 
It lives among the leaf litter, in secondary forests with good canopy and presence of bromeliads, where it deposits its tadpoles, which it cares for and carries on the back to a water source. It feeds on insects, especially ants.

Taxonomy 
It was discovered by Oscar Javier Gallego Carvajal of the University of Tolima in a fragment of secondary forest of the village of El Llano, in Falan. The description of the species was made together with José Vicente Rueda Almonacid, Marco Rada, Santiago J. Sánchez Pacheco and Alvaro Andrés Velásquez Alvarez, of Conservación Internacional Colombia and was published in Zootaxa in 2006.

Threats 
It is threatened by habitat loss (logging, farming), hunting, and as a pet/display animal.

References 

dorisswansonae
Amphibians described in 2006